Four Lanes was an electoral division of Cornwall in the United Kingdom which returned one member to sit on Cornwall Council between 2013 and 2021. It was abolished at the 2021 local elections, being succeeded by Four Lanes, Beacon and Troon and Pool and Tehidy.

Councillors

Extent
Four Lanes covered the villages of Piece, Carnkie and Four Lanes and the hamlets of Tolskithy, Penhallick and Treskillard. The village of Illogan Highway was shared with the Pool and Tehidy division, the settlement of Blowinghouse was shared with the Redruth North division, the village of Brea was shared with the Camborne Treslothan division and parts of Carn Brea Village were covered by Redruth South division. The division covered 922 hectares in total.

Election results

2017 election

2013 election

References

Electoral divisions of Cornwall Council